Theobald I (French: Thibaut or Thibauld de Bar) (born  – died 13 February 1214) was Count of Bar from 1190 until his death, and a Count of Luxemburg from 1197 until his death. He was the son of Reginald II of Bar and his wife Agnès de Champagne. He became count when his brother, Henry, was killed in the siege of Acre.

After his third marriage, he sought to reclaim his wife's lands of Luxembourg, Durbuy and Laroche with the approval of Philip of Swabia.  Theobold therefore besieged the castle at Namur, whereupon a conference was held in which Philip of Namur and his brother Baldwin renounced the disputed territories of Luxembourg, Durbuy and Laroche. The Treaty of Dinant signed 6 July 1199 at Saint Medard, later made it official.

After his death in 1214, his eldest son Henry II, from his second marriage; succeeded him as count. His eldest daughter Agnes, from his first marriage, married Frederick II, Duke of Lorraine. His lands in Luxembourg reverted to Waleran III of Limburg, who married Theobald's widow Ermesinde of Namur. Theobald was buried at St. Mihiel.

Marriage 
Theobald I was married three times; in 1176 he married Laurette of Loon (de Looz), daughter of Louis I, Count of Loon and Agnes of Metz; They had one daughter. Secondly, he married Ermensinde de Bar-sur-Seine, daughter of Guy II of Brienne and Petronille de Chacenay, circa 1189; They had one son and two daughters. Theobald and Ermensinde divorced circa 1195. He then, married Ermensinde of Luxembourg, daughter of Henry Coecus "the Blind" of Luxembourg and Agnes of Gueldres, in 1197; They had two sons and three daughters.

Issue 
Children from his marriage to Laurette of Loon (de Looz):
 Agnes (Tomasia) of Bar, Dame d'Amance, de Longwy et de Stenay (b. c 1177, d. 19 Jun 1226); married Frederick II, Duke of Lorraine.

Children from his marriage to Ermesinde (Isabella) of Bar-sur-Seine:
 Agnes II of Bar (d. 1225); married Hugues, Seigneur de Chatillon.
 Henry II, Count of Bar (b. 1190, d. 13 Nov 1239); married Philippa of Dreux. 
 Margaret of Bar (b. c 1192, d. after 1259); married Heinrich von Salm, Seigneur de Viviers.

Children from his marriage to Ermesinde (Ermesinda) of Luxembourg:
 Margaret II of Bar (d. Jul 1270); married Hugues III, Comte de Vaudémont, second marriage to, Henri de Dampierre, Seigneur du Bois.
 Elisabeth of Bar (d. between 11 Apr 1262 - 1 Aug 1262); married Waleran of Limburg, Seigneur de Fauquemont & Montjoie.
 Henry of Bar, Lord of Briey, Arrancy, & Marville. (d. 1214)
 Renaud of Bar (d. Feb 1214)
 unknown daughter (d. before Feb 1214)

Notes

References

1150s births
1214 deaths

Year of birth uncertain
Christians of the Third Crusade
Counts of Bar
House of Montbelliard